Victor Saville (25 September 1895 – 8 May 1979) was an English film director, producer, and screenwriter. He directed 39 films between 1927 and 1954. He also produced 36 films between 1923 and 1962.

Biography
Saville produced his first film, Woman to Woman, with Michael Balcon in 1923, and on the back of its success produced pictures for the veteran director Maurice Elvey, including the classic British silent Hindle Wakes (1927). His first picture as director was The Arcadians (1927). In 1929 he and Balcon worked together again on a talkie remake of Woman to Woman for Balcon's company, Gainsborough Pictures. This time Saville directed it.

From 1931, as Gainsborough Pictures and the Gaumont British Picture Corporation joined forces, Saville produced a string of comedies, musicals and dramas for Gainsborough and Gaumont-British, including the popular Jessie Matthews pictures. In 1937, he left to set up his own production company, Victor Saville Productions, and made three pictures for Alexander Korda's London Films at Denham studios.

As an independent producer he had purchased the film rights to A. J. Cronin's novel The Citadel. He was persuaded to sell them to Metro-Goldwyn-Mayer in return for the chance to produce the film and another big-budget adaptation, Goodbye Mr Chips (1939). Both films starred Robert Donat and were a great success in the US as well as in Britain, providing Saville with a passport to Hollywood.

When the war broke out in 1939, Saville was in America and was advised to remain there. He produced pictures in support of the war effort, such as The Mortal Storm and Forever and a Day (1943) (in which he worked for the last time with his former star Jessie Matthews), and in 1945 Tonight and Every Night, based on the history of the Windmill Theatre in London.

After the war Saville continued directing films for MGM but eventually returned to Britain. Saville acquired production rights for Mickey Spillane's Mike Hammer mysteries and produced a few features, though Spillane thought he was interested in doing so only to acquire the money to produce The Silver Chalice. He produced two final films in the 1960s, The Greengage Summer (1961), adapted from the novel of the same name, and Mix Me a Person (1962).

Selected filmography

Notes

References
 BFI screenonline biography "Saville, Victor" Retrieved on 2 February 2009
 Lloyd & Robinson (1983). Movies of the Thirties. Orbis Publishing, London. .

External links

1895 births
1979 deaths
English film directors
English film producers
English male screenwriters
People from Birmingham, West Midlands
20th-century English screenwriters
20th-century English male writers
20th-century English businesspeople